David Arnoldo Cabrera Rivera (born January 27, 1949) is a retired football player from El Salvador.

Club career
Cabrera is the alltime top goalscorer of Primera División side C.D. FAS, with 242 goals scored in a 20 years career with the club between the years 1966–1986. Although he won three Primera division titles (1972, 1981, 1983) his best season during his 20 years in the Primera Division was during the 1975–1976 season where he scored 25 goals and his best game performance was in FAS 7–2 victory against UES on January 3, 1980, where he scored six of the team seven goals.

International career
Cabrera represented his country during the qualifiers for the 1978 FIFA World Cup in Argentina. He was included in the squad for the 1970 tournament but did not play.

Honours
 FAS
Primera División (4): 1977–78, 1978–79, 1981, 1984
CONCACAF Champions' Cup (1): 1979

Individual
Primera División Top Scorer (3): 1972 with 15 goals, 1981 with 20 goals and 1983 with 16 goals.

References

External links

Association football forwards
Salvadoran footballers
El Salvador international footballers
1970 FIFA World Cup players
C.D. FAS footballers
Sportspeople from San Salvador
1949 births
Living people